Acria meyricki is a moth in the family Depressariidae. It was described by Shashank in 2014. It is found in India (Andhra Pradesh).

The larvae feed on oil palms.

References

Moths described in 2014
Acria